Thomas Henry Thould (11 January 1886 – 15 June 1971) was an English water polo player who competed in the 1908 Summer Olympics representing Great Britain. Thomas played a paramount role in the 1908 final. He was part of the British team, which won the gold medal.

See also
 Great Britain men's Olympic water polo team records and statistics
 List of Olympic champions in men's water polo
 List of Olympic medalists in water polo (men)

References

External links
 

1886 births
1971 deaths
English male water polo players
Water polo players at the 1908 Summer Olympics
Olympic water polo players of Great Britain
English Olympic medallists
Olympic gold medallists for Great Britain
Olympic medalists in water polo
Medalists at the 1908 Summer Olympics